The cabinet led by Prime Minister Manouchehr Eghbal of Iran lasted for three years between April 1957 and September 1960 making it one of the longest tenure cabinets of the Pahlavi rule. The cabinet succeeded the second cabinet of Hossein Ala' who resigned on 3 April 1957.

Activities and end
Manouchehr Eghbal's cabinet was inaugurated on 4 April 1957. Eghbal was the head of the Nationalists' Party. The opposition party was People's Party of Asadollah Alam. One of the first activities of the cabinet was to terminate the martial law on 7 April. However, some of the cabinet members were military officers, including Hassan Akhavi and Ahmad Vosuq. Most of the activities of the cabinet were in line with the political agenda of the Shah.

The cabinet program was approved by the Majlis on 14 April receiving 110 favor votes to 0 with 4 abstentions. Three days later on 17 April the cabinet was endorsed by the Senate with 30 favor votes to 0 against votes with 3 abstentions.

The term of the cabinet ended in September 1960 following the general elections held in late August 1960. The Nationalists' Party won the majority at the 200-seat Parliament. However, the Shah annulled the elections. On 6 September Prime Minister Eghbal submitted his resignation to the Shah because of the mass protests over the election results. Another reason for the resignation of Eghbal was his fierce opposition against the Soviet Union due to which he was criticized by the Soviet leader Nikita Khrushchev. The next cabinet was formed by Jafar Sharif Emami.

Cabinet members
The cabinet was consisted of the following members:

Reshuffles
Interior Minister Fatollah Jalali was replaced by an army general Nader Batmanghelidj in 1958. Batmanghelidj's term was very brief and ended in 1959 when Rahmat Allah Atabaki replaced him in the post. Agriculture Minister Hassan Akhavi was removed from office in 1959 due to his opposition to the land reform plans and was replaced by Jamshid Amouzegar in the post. Agha Khan Bakhtiar, labor minister, was replaced by Abdolreza Ansari who was in office until September 1960.

References

External links

1957 establishments in Iran
1960 disestablishments in Iran
Cabinets of Iran
Cabinets established in 1957
Cabinets disestablished in 1960